Frazer Road (officially ) is a mixed residential-cum-commercial neighbourhood in Patna. This is the road most frequently heard after coming out from the Patna Junction as it connects Patna Junction to Gandhi Maidan Marg - the two major hubs of the city. It emerges from the South West Corner of Gandhi Maidan. It merges with Gandhi Maidan Marg, which takes a full circle of the Gandhi Maidan. Fraser Road passes through Dakbangla Chauraha, which is an important crossing in the city. The area around Frazer Road, including New Dak Bangla Road, Exhibition Road, and S P Verma Road has big brands names in marketing and covers all type of shops. Frazer Road is a location for hotels, restaurants, bars, and high-street stores in the capital of the Indian state of Bihar. The area is served by Kotwali PS under Patna Police.

Problems
Frazer road has long suffered from problems of over-crowding, traffic congestion, haphazard construction of buildings and illegal hawking. There have been several cases of shootings and robberies occurring on Frazer road. Parking space availability is a major problem.

See also

 Bailey Road, Patna

References

Neighbourhoods in Patna